Kia ora (approximated in English as   or  ) is a Māori-language greeting which has entered New Zealand English. It translates literally as "have life" or "be healthy", wishing the essence of life upon someone, from one speaker to the other. It is used as an informal greeting or farewell equivalent to "hi", "hello" or "goodbye" and can be used as an expression of thanks similar to "cheers". As a greeting it is comparable to the term "" (used in Australian and New Zealand English).

Meaning
Kia ora can be used to wish somebody life and health—the word ora used as a noun means "life, health and vitality". It might also be used as a salutation, a farewell or an expression of thanks. It also signifies agreement with a speaker at a meeting, being as it is from a culture that prizes oratory. It is widely used alongside other more formal Māori greetings. The New Zealand Ministry for Culture and Heritage website NZ History lists it as one of 100 Māori words every New Zealander should know, and lists the following definition: "Hi!, G'day! (general informal greeting)".

Kia ora can follow a similar pattern to address different specific numbers of people. By itself, it can be used to address any number of people, but by adding koe (i.e., kia ora koe); kōrua; and koutou one can specify a greeting to, respectively, a single; two; or three or more people. Similarly, by following with tātou, one addresses all the people present, including the speaker themselves.

Commercial use

New Zealand's national airline, Air New Zealand, uses Kia Ora as the name for its inflight magazine. Water Safety New Zealand, a water-safety advocacy organisation, has a specific Māori water safety programme, Kia Maanu Kia Ora, which makes use of the literal meaning of kia ora, as their message translates as stay afloat; stay alive.

Controversy
In 1984, an Auckland telephone operator, Naida Glavish, was instructed to stop using kia ora when greeting callers after the post office had received a complaint. She refused to do so and was consequently demoted, with the whole affair attracting much public interest. She was later given back her original job. The Postmaster-General, Rob Talbot, convinced the then Prime Minister Robert Muldoon to overturn the prohibition on kia ora.

In other languages 
Kia ora has a similar meaning to the word kia orana, found in many related Polynesian languages such as Cook Islands Māori.

See also

 Aloha
Talofa
Māori influence on New Zealand English
List of English words of Māori origin

References

Māori words and phrases
Greeting words and phrases